Mocis antillesia is a moth of the family Erebidae. It is found on the Lesser Antilles, Bahamas and British Virgin Islands.

References

Moths described in 1913
antillesia